Sir William Blackledge Beaumont,  (born 9 March 1952 in Chorley, Lancashire, England) is a former rugby union player, and was captain of the England rugby union team, earning 34 caps. His greatest moment as captain was the unexpected 1980 Grand Slam win. He played as a lock.

He was Chairman of the Rugby Football Union from 2012 to 2016 and has been Chairman of World Rugby since 1 July 2016.

Early life and youth
Beaumont was educated at Cressbrook School, Kirkby Lonsdale (also attended by another England and British Lions player, John Spencer) and Ellesmere College in Shropshire. He joined Fylde Rugby Club, Lancashire, in 1969 when he was 17 years old and stayed with the club until injury forced his retirement in 1982.

Playing career
Beaumont won 34 caps for England, then a record for a lock, and was captain 21 times. He made his international debut as a 22-year-old in Dublin in 1975 as a late replacement for Roger Uttley. He toured Australia in 1975, Japan, Fiji and Tonga in 1979, and Argentina in 1981 with England. He played 15 times for the Barbarians, including the match against the All Blacks in 1978.

Beaumont took part in the 1977 British Lions tour to New Zealand after being called up as a replacement when Nigel Horton broke his thumb, and played in the final three tests.

He took over as England captain in Paris in 1978. He was an inspiring captain of the North of England, whom he led to victory over the All Blacks in 1979, and also of England, who won their first Grand Slam for 23 years in 1980.

Beaumont then captained the 1980 British Lions tour to South Africa playing in 10 of the 18 matches. He was the first English captain of the Lions since Doug Prentice in 1930.

Beaumont retired from rugby in 1982 on medical advice from doctors, because of successive concussions.

Media and business
Beaumont became a regular contestant on the BBC quiz show A Question of Sport, eventually becoming the show's second longest-serving captain (14 years in total), only being surpassed by fellow Rugby Union player Matt Dawson in 2018. The opposing captains were Willie Carson, Emlyn Hughes and Ian Botham. Beaumont hosted two episodes of the show in 1996 in the regular host David Coleman's absence: Will Carling stood in as captain for Beaumont's team.

He was the managing director of his family's textile business in Lancashire, which is the only remaining textile manufacturer in Chorley, but resigned in May 2017.

Rugby administration
Beaumont has represented England since 1999 on the International Rugby Board (now World Rugby). He was the tour manager for the 2005 British & Irish Lions tour to New Zealand. In January 2012 he put his name forward to become the next Rugby Football Union chairman, and was appointed as the chairman on 8 July 2012.
He then applied for the role of Chairman of World Rugby to replace Bernard Lapasset and on 11 May 2016 he was unanimously elected to the office, with his tenure beginning on 1 July 2016.

He is an Honorary President of the rugby charity Wooden Spoon that funds projects for disadvantaged children and young people in Britain and Ireland.

In 2007 the Rugby Football Union announced that the winners of the English County Championship would be awarded the Bill Beaumont Cup.

Already Officer of the Order of the British Empire (OBE), he was appointed Commander of the Order of the British Empire (CBE) in the 2008 Birthday Honours. He was knighted in the Queen's New Years Honours list in 2019. He is a Deputy Lieutenant of Lancashire.

See also
 International Rugby Hall of Fame

Footnotes

Sources
 Profile on Rugby Hall of Fame

External links
 

1952 births
Barbarian F.C. players
British & Irish Lions rugby union players from England
Commanders of the Order of the British Empire
Deputy Lieutenants of Lancashire
England international rugby union players
English rugby union administrators
English rugby union players
Fylde Rugby Club players
World Rugby Hall of Fame inductees
Knights Bachelor
Lancashire County RFU players
Living people
People educated at Ellesmere College
People from Chorley
Rugby players and officials awarded knighthoods
Rugby union locks
World Rugby Committee members